JWH-369 ((5-(2-chlorophenyl)-1-pentyl-1H-pyrrol-3-yl)(naphthalen-1-yl)methanone) is a synthetic cannabinoid from the naphthoylpyrrole family which acts as a potent agonist of the CB1 (Ki = 7.9 ± 0.4nM) and CB2 (Ki = 5.2 ± 0.3nM) receptors, with a slight selectivity for the latter. JWH-369 was first synthesized in 2006 by John W. Huffman and colleagues to examine the nature of ligand binding to the CB1 receptor.

Legality
In the United States JWH-369 is not federally scheduled, although some states have passed legislation banning the sale, possession, and manufacture of JWH-369.

In Canada, JWH-369 and other naphthoylpyrrole-based cannabinoids are Schedule II controlled substances under the Controlled Drugs and Substances Act.

In the United Kingdom, JWH-369 and other naphthoylpyrrole-based cannabinoids are considered Class B drugs under the Misuse of Drugs Act 1971.

References 

JWH cannabinoids
CB1 receptor agonists
CB2 receptor agonists
Designer drugs
Naphthoylpyrroles